The siege of Naarden was an investment of the city of Naarden from November 1813 until May 1814 by a Dutch and Russian army as part of the liberation of the Netherlands during the War of the Sixth Coalition. This siege took months, since the French commander didn't believe that Napoleon was captured. Finally, the French soldiers were given a retreat with honour.

Prelude 
In October 1813, Napoleon was defeated at the Battle of Leipzig. As a result, the Sixth Coalition decided to liberate the Netherlands which had been occupied for almost 20 years. Their king, Willem I, was in exile in England and returned to Holland in November 1813. He received military assistance from Prussian and Russian armies.

The battle 
Russian cossacks were the first soldiers that approached Naarden. French soldiers retreated into the fortress, awaiting the (hoped for) return of Napoleon. This scenario happened in multiple cities in Holland, like Den Helder, Delfzijl and Gorinchem. However, the French forces in Naarden didn't surrender and were highly capable of keeping their strength. They even had some Dutch soldiers fighting on their side, which were enlisted in the Grande Armée. During the siege, most of the city was destroyed by bombardments. However, there were almost no casualties since the French and civilians were capable of hiding within the fortress walls.

When the allied forces received the message that Napoleon was captured, the French forces didn't believe them and held on. Finally, after many attempts, a special message from the French government was able to convince them after all. In May 1814, the French soldiers were given a retreat with honour.

Aftermath 
Although the siege of Naarden was strategically not highly relevant, the victory was of significant importance to Willem I. He needed to prove that the Sovereign Principality of the United Netherlands was capable of surviving on its own since the superpowers where redrawing European borders. At the end, the Kingdom of the Netherlands was allowed to exist (an alternative was to add it to the English Empire or the Prussian territories) and needed to function as a bufferstate.

In the short term however, Napoleon escaped from his imprisonment on Elba and returned to France. This resulted in the battle of Waterloo in June 1815.

References

External links 
The Siege of Naarden (documentary), YouTube

Napoleonic Wars
1813 in military history
1814 in military history
1813 in the Netherlands
1814 in the Netherlands
Naarden
Gooise Meren